Chevauchée of the Black Prince may refer to:

 Black Prince's chevauchée of 1355
 Black Prince's chevauchée of 1356